Neville Vernon Lindsay (30 July 1886 – 2 February 1976) was a South African cricketer who played in one Test in 1921–22. He was born in Harrismith, Orange Free State, and died in Pietermaritzburg, Natal.

References

External links
 

1886 births
1976 deaths
South Africa Test cricketers
South African cricketers
Gauteng cricketers
Free State cricketers